Mount Pearl South was a prosperous, mostly suburban provincial electoral district for the House of Assembly of Newfoundland and Labrador, Canada. Prior to the 2007 provincial election, the district was known as Mount Pearl. Mount Pearl South has seen an expansion in big-box retail outlets in recent years. In 2011, there were 8,114 eligible voters living within the district.

The district was created in 1975 and was a Tory stronghold for two decades, with Progressive Conservative Neil Windsor holding the seat from 1975 to 1995. The seat went Liberal in 1996 when Brian Tobin won a large majority government, but returned to the Progressive Conservatives, under Dave Denine, in 2003 when the party swept back to power. Denine won again in the 2007 election.

Dave Denine retired just before the writ was dropped in 2011. The 2011 Election was contested between Progressive Conservative nominee Paul Lane, a Mount Pearl city councillor, New Democrat John Riche, a Real Estate Agent and Liberal Norm Snelgrove, a civic administrator. Paul Lane won the 2011 contest by 700 votes on October 11, 2011 and remained the district's MHA until its dissolution.

On January 20, 2014 Paul Lane announced he was leaving the governing PC Party to sit with the Opposition Liberal Party. In 2015, an electoral district boundary review resulted in the districts dissolution, with its territory being incorporated into Mount Pearl-Southlands.

Members of the House of Assembly
The district had elected the following Members of the House of Assembly:

Election results 

|-

|-
 
|NDP
|John Riche
|align="right"|1,675
|align="right"|38.51
|align="right"|+31.78
|-

|}

|-

|-

|-
 
|NDP
|Tom McGinnis
|align="right"|332
|align="right"|6.73
|align="right"| -0.51
|}

|-

|-

|-
 
|NDP
|Roy Locke
|align="right"|504
|align="right"| 7.24
|align="right"| 
|}

References

External links 
Website of the Newfoundland and Labrador House of Assembly

Mount Pearl
Newfoundland and Labrador provincial electoral districts